Cesar Carrillo (born April 29, 1984) is an American professional baseball pitcher who played in Major League Baseball with the San Diego Padres in 2009. Carrillo was a 2005 first round draft pick by the Padres, selected #18 overall. He was inducted to the University of Miami Baseball Hall of Fame in 2019, where he went 24–0 to start his career. Carrillo was released by the Detroit Tigers in 2013, after he was implicated in the Bio-Genesis scandal, he served a 100- game suspension under the Tigers minor league system. He was with the Arizona Diamondbacks in 2014.

Amateur career

High school 
Carrillo attended Mt. Carmel High School in Chicago which boasts other famous sports alums such as Donovan McNabb, Simeon Rice, Antoine Walker, Chris Chelios, and Denny McLain, where he was a two sport star in both basketball and baseball. As a junior, Carrillo decided to concentrate solely on baseball. He played both shortstop and pitcher. As a shortstop, he broke the school's single season hit record with 52 hits his junior year to go along with a 5–1 record and a 1.12 ERA. His senior year, Carrillo posted a 9–1 record with an ERA of 0.96 while batting .370 with 5 home runs and 48 RBI which led to his selection to the All-State team.

College 
Carrillo chose to attend the University of Miami to play baseball for head coach Jim Morris. However, under NCAA regulations, a low score on the ACT exam which Carrillo took to gain entry into the university forced him to sit out the entire 2003 season.

In  Carrillo went 12–0 with two saves while keeping his ERA at 2.69 and compiling 91 strikeouts in 113.2 innings pitched. After the 2004 season, he played collegiate summer baseball with the Brewster Whitecaps of the Cape Cod Baseball League. Carrillo still managed to obtain one of the most remarkable (albeit not record breaking) streaks in the history of college baseball by starting his career with a record of 24–0. However, Carrillo lost his last two decisions as a starter, the final one coming against Nebraska and Joba Chamberlain in the 2005 Super Regional. Carrillo still compiled impressive stats in the 2005 season by going 13–3 with one save and a 2.22 ERA while striking out 127 batters in 125.2 innings pitched.

Professional career

San Diego Padres

Minor leagues
Carrillo was drafted in the 1st round, 18th overall in the 2005 MLB Draft by the San Diego Padres. Carrillo signed immediately even though he felt that what the Padres offered him did not match what he felt he deserved. However, Carrillo felt that in the end, his skills would do all the negotiating for him and when he signed his next contract, his loyalty and willingness to prove himself would ultimately translate into a large contract. Carrillo, by most scouts' accounts, was the most "Major League ready" pitcher in the entire draft and it was expected that he could reach the big leagues as a starter within the next year or so. According to Sports Illustrated, Carrillo's "stuff" (his array of pitches) is of Major League caliber. In 2007 scout.com ranked him as the number 1 prospect in the Padres' organization, while Baseball America moved him down to the number 2 prospect, after ranking him number 1 the year before. Carrillo throws a fastball, which has been clocked at 97 MPH, along with a change-up, curveball, and two-seam fastball that reaches somewhere between 89 and 91 MPH and has a lot of movement.

Carrillo began his professional career with the Single-A Lake Elsinore Storm where he started 7 games and went 1–2 with a 7.01 ERA with 29 strikeouts in 25.2 innings pitched. He then made his way up to Double-A Mobile where he went 1–3 with a 3.02 ERA to go along with 43 strikeouts in 50.2 innings pitched. On May 19, Carrillo joined the Triple-A Portland Beavers. However, he was only able to pitch 2.2 innings because of tightness in his right throwing elbow. Carrillo was sent to the Padre team specialist in San Diego and was told that he would need to rehab the elbow for roughly a month. Carrillo, as well as the Padre organization, were pleased with this as opposed to Carrillo being forced to have surgery.

However, in early 2007, Carrillo's arm had not responded to rest and it was determined he needed Tommy John surgery on his elbow. He rehabbed and came back to pitch in June 2008, finishing up the year with Lake Elsinore Storm. His arm strength and control improved during the summer. Carrillo played with the San Antonio Missions in 2009.

Carrillo pitched well in Class AA during the second half of 2009, and was promoted to AAA Portland on July 29.

Carrillo made his Major league debut on August 13, 2009, against the Milwaukee Brewers, giving up three home runs. He went 1–2 in three starts with San Diego.

Carrillo competed for a spot in the starting rotation in Spring training 2010. However, he did not make the team and was optioned to Triple A Portland. On September 2, 2010, he was designated for assignment by the Padres

Philadelphia Phillies
On September 9, 2010, Carrillo was claimed off waivers by the Philadelphia Phillies.  He was only with the organization for 3 days, as the Phillies designated him for assignment on September 12.  The Padres then reclaimed Carrillo off waivers on September 15.

Houston Astros
On September 22, 2010, Carrillo was claimed off waivers by the Houston Astros. He was released on April 29, 2011.

Detroit Tigers
At the beginning of spring training in 2012, however, Carrillo remained an unsigned free agent. In June 2012, Carrillo signed a minor league contract with the Detroit Tigers.

On January 29, 2013, Carrillo was one of seven baseball players involved in a Miami New Times steroid probe investigation. On March 15, he was suspended for 100 games for violating the Minor League Drug Prevention and Treatment Program.

Sugar Land Skeeters
The Tigers released him after the conclusion of his suspension and he signed with the independent Sugar Land Skeeters of the Atlantic League of Professional Baseball.

Arizona Diamondbacks
Carrillo signed a minor league deal with the Arizona Diamondbacks in January 2014.

Broncos de Reynosa
In 2015, he signed with the Broncos de Reynosa of the Mexican League. After the season, he was selected to the roster for the Mexico national baseball team at the 2015 WBSC Premier12. Carrillo began the 2016 season with the Broncos.

Pericos de Puebla
Partway through the season, Carrillo joined the Pericos de Puebla.

Sultanes de Monterrey
Carrillo completed the 2016 season with the Sultanes de Monterrey. Carrillo played the entire 2017 season with the Sultanes.

Bravos de Leon
Carrillo joined the Bravos de León for the 2018 season, and began the 2019 season with the Bravos.

Tecolotes de los Dos Laredos
Partway through the 2019 season, Carrillo joined the Tecolotes de los Dos Laredos. He was released on July 27, 2019.

References

External links

, or CPBL

1984 births
Living people
American baseball players of Mexican descent
American expatriate baseball players in Mexico
American expatriate baseball players in Taiwan
Baseball players from Chicago
Bravos de León players
Bravos de Margarita players
Brewster Whitecaps players
Broncos de Reynosa players
Brother Elephants players
Corpus Christi Hooks players
Criollos de Caguas players
Erie SeaWolves players
Gigantes del Cibao players
American expatriate baseball players in the Dominican Republic
Lake Elsinore Storm players
Lakeland Flying Tigers players
Laredo Lemurs players
Lancaster Barnstormers players
Liga de Béisbol Profesional Roberto Clemente pitchers
Major League Baseball pitchers
Mexican League baseball pitchers
Miami Hurricanes baseball players
Mobile BayBears players
Peoria Saguaros players
Pericos de Puebla players
Portland Beavers players
San Antonio Missions players
San Diego Padres players
Sugar Land Skeeters players
Sultanes de Monterrey players
Tecolotes de los Dos Laredos players
Tigres de Aragua players
American expatriate baseball players in Venezuela
Tigres de Quintana Roo players